Best Choreography (最優秀振付け賞)

Results
The following table displays the nominees and the winners in bold print with a yellow background.

2010s

See also
MTV Video Music Award for Best Choreography